KJKQ (99.5 FM, "Jack FM") is a radio station licensed to serve Sisseton, South Dakota. The station is owned by Prairie Winds Broadcasting, Inc. It airs an Adult Hits format.

The station was assigned the KJKQ call letters by the Federal Communications Commission on September 10, 2012.

References

External links

Official Website

2013 establishments in South Dakota
Jack FM stations
Radio stations established in 2013
JKQ
Roberts County, South Dakota
Adult hits radio stations in the United States